Bradley Thomas Gericke (born December 3, 1965) is a military historian and retired United States Army major general who last served as the Deputy Director of Strategy, Plans, and Policy of the Army Staff from July 2019 to April 2022. He was previously the Deputy Director of Joint Strategic Planning, Strategy, Plans, and Policy of the Joint Staff.

Born in Illinois, Gericke graduated from the United States Military Academy in 1988 with a B.S. degree in modern European history. He earned an M.A. degree in history from Vanderbilt University in 1996 with a thesis entitled Good members of the Commonwealth: the professionalization of teaching in early modern England. Gericke then served as an assistant professor of history at the U.S. Military Academy from 1996 to 1998. He received a Master of Military Art and Science degree in strategy from the Army Command and General Staff College in 2001 with a thesis entitled Civil wars in Britain, 1640-1646: military revolution on campaign and completed a Ph.D. degree in military history at Vanderbilt in September 2002 with a thesis entitled Covenanters to battle: the Scots' victory during the Bishops' Wars, 1639–1640. Gericke also earned an M.S. degree in national security strategy from the National Defense University.

Publications

References

|-

1965 births
Living people
Place of birth missing (living people)
United States Military Academy alumni
Military personnel from Illinois
United States Army personnel of the Gulf War
Vanderbilt University alumni
United States Military Academy faculty
United States Army Command and General Staff College alumni
American military historians
United States Army personnel of the Iraq War
National Defense University alumni
American male non-fiction writers
Recipients of the Legion of Merit
United States Army generals
Recipients of the Defense Superior Service Medal